James Joseph Donahue (April 20, 1885, Brooklyn – March 15, 1966, Glen Rock, New Jersey) was an American athlete who competed mainly in the pentathlon. He competed in the pentathlon for the United States team during the 1912 Summer Olympics held in Stockholm, Sweden where he won the bronze medal. On winner Jim Thorpe's subsequent disqualification for playing semi-professional baseball in 1913, Donahue was declared vice-champion (silver medalist). In 1982 Thorpe was reinstated as champion by the IOC; however, Donahue was still to be considered vice-champion (silver medalist).

References

1885 births
1966 deaths
American pentathletes
Olympic bronze medalists for the United States in track and field
Olympic silver medalists for the United States in track and field
Athletes (track and field) at the 1912 Summer Olympics
Sportspeople from Brooklyn
Medalists at the 1912 Summer Olympics
American male decathletes
Track and field athletes from New York City
Olympic male pentathletes
Olympic decathletes